Hollywood was an unincorporated community located in Raleigh County, West Virginia, United States. Its post office  no longer exists.  There is also a Hollywood in Monroe County, West Virginia. Hollywood was renamed to MacArthur in 1942. However, it was a distinct mining community with its own coal mines  see mine map 336094, located in Beckley. MacArthur used different mines  see mine map 335329.

References 

Unincorporated communities in West Virginia
Unincorporated communities in Raleigh County, West Virginia
Coal towns in West Virginia